The 1971 NCAA Indoor Track and Field Championships were contested March 12−13, 1971 at Cobo Arena in Detroit, Michigan at the seventh annual NCAA-sanctioned track meet to determine the individual and team national champions of men's collegiate indoor track and field events in the United States.

Villanova topped the team standings, finishing only 2.75 points ahead of Texas–El Paso; it was the Wildcats' second overall indoor team title.

Qualification
Unlike other NCAA-sponsored sports, there were not separate University Division and College Division championships for indoor track and field until 1985. As such, all athletes and teams from University and College Division programs were eligible to compete.

Team standings 
 Note: Top 10 only
 (DC) = Defending Champions
 Full results

References

NCAA Indoor Track and Field Championships
Ncaa Indoor Track And Field Championships
Ncaa Indoor Track And Field Championships
NCAA Indoor Track and Field Championships